The 2011–12 Lamar Cardinals basketball team represented Lamar University during the 2011–12 NCAA Division I men's basketball season. The Cardinals, led by first year head coach Pat Knight, played their home games at the Montagne Center and are members of the East Division of the Southland Conference. The Cardinals finished the season 23–12, 11–5 in Southland play. They were the champions of the Southland East Division and are the champions of the Southland Basketball tournament and earned an automatic bid into the 2012 NCAA tournament where they lost to Vermont in the First Four round.

Roster

Schedule

|+ Schedule
|-
!colspan=9 style="" | Exhibition

|-
!colspan=9 style="" | Regular season

|-
!colspan=9 style="" | 

|-
!colspan=9 style="" | 2012 NCAA Tournament

References

Lamar Cardinals basketball seasons
Lamar
Lamar
Lamar Cardinals basketball
Lamar Cardinals basketball